Mount Emei, alternately Mount Omei, is a  mountain in Sichuan Province, China, and is the highest of the Four Sacred Buddhist Mountains of China. Mount Emei sits at the western rim of the Sichuan Basin. The mountains west of it are known as Daxiangling.
A large surrounding area of countryside is geologically known as the Permian Emeishan Large Igneous Province, a large igneous province generated by the Emeishan Traps volcanic eruptions during the Permian Period.

Administratively, Mount Emei is located near the county-level city of the same name (Emeishan City), which is in turn part of the prefecture-level city of Leshan. It was made a UNESCO World Heritage Site in 1996.

As a sacred mountain
Mount Emei is one of the Four Sacred Buddhist Mountains of China, and is traditionally regarded as the bodhimaṇḍa, or place of enlightenment, of the Bodhisattva Samantabhadra. Samantabhadra is known in Mandarin as Pǔxián Púsà.

Sources of the 16th and 17th centuries allude to the practice of martial arts in the monasteries of Mount Emei, which made the earliest extant reference to the Shaolin Monastery as the place of origin of Chinese martial arts.

Buddhist architecture on Emei
This is the location of the first Buddhist temple built in China in the 1st century CE.
The site has seventy-six Buddhist monasteries of the Ming and Qing dynasties, most of them located near the mountain top. The monasteries demonstrate a flexible architectural style that adapts to the landscape. Some, such as the halls of Baoguosi, are built on terraces of varying levels, while others, including the structures of Leiyinsi, are on raised stilts. Here the fixed plans of Buddhist monasteries of earlier periods were modified or ignored in order to make full use of the natural scenery. The buildings of Qingyinge are laid out in an irregular plot on the narrow piece of land between the Black Dragon River and the White Dragon River.

Cable cars ease the ascent to the two temples at Jinding (3,077 m), an hour's hike from the mountain's peak.

Climate 
The summit of Mount Emei has an alpine subarctic climate (Köppen Dwc), with long, cold (but not severely so) winters, and short, cool summers. Precipitation is common year-round (occurring on more than 250 days), but due to the influence of the monsoon, rainfall is especially heavy in summer, and more than 70% of the annual total occurs from June to September.

Indigenous animals
Visitors to Mount Emei will likely see dozens of Tibetan macaques, which can often be viewed taking food from tourists. Local merchants sell nuts for tourists to feed the monkeys. Other featured animals include Rana adenopleura, Vibrissaphora liui and Pheretima praepinguis.

Flora

Mount Emei is known for its high level of endemism and approximately 200 plant species in various plant families have been described from this mountain.

A rare species of Fir tree is endemic to this mountain it is Abies Fabri.

Gallery

See also
 Baoguo Temple
 Fuhu Temple 
 Jinding, main peak of Mount Emei 
 Shengji Bronze Bell
 Wannian Temple
 Xixiang Chi, also known as Tianhua Chanyuan
 Zuo Ci
 Emei School, fictional martial arts school

References

External links

 Religion and the environment in China, 中国的宗教与环境 - chinadialogue article
 Mount Emei, including Leshan Giant Buddha, Scenic Area: official Unesco site

Chinese Buddhist grottoes
Emei
National parks of China
World Heritage Sites in China
Chinese architectural history
Emei
Tourist attractions in Leshan
Buddhism in Sichuan
Major National Historical and Cultural Sites in Sichuan
Buddhist sites in China
Emei